A surgeon is a person who performs surgery.

Surgeon or Surgeons may also refer to:

 Surgeon General (disambiguation), various high-ranking medical officials
 Surgeon (musician), the moniker of British electronic music producer and DJ, Anthony Child
 In military usage, a unit's assigned physician (who may not be an "operating" surgeon per se)
 Flight surgeon, Ship's surgeon, etc.
Surgeons (TV series), 2017 Chinese TV series

See also
The Surgeon (disambiguation)
Surgeonfish
Sturgeon, 26 species of fish